"One Life" is a song by the Norwegian urban duo Madcon featuring guest vocals by American recording artist Kelly Rowland. It was written by band members Yosef Wolde-Mariam and Tshawe Baqwa along with Rowland, Katerina Bramley, and TJ Oosterhuis, with production helmed by the latter. The second single to be lifted from Madcon's upcoming second studio album Icon (2013), it was released on May 13, 2013, throughout Europe.

Music video
A music video for the song was filmed by Norwegian director Ray Kay.

Track listings and formats
Digital EP
 "One Life" (Radio Edit) – 3:31
 "One Life" (Bodybangers Remix) – 5:23
 "One Life" (Nino Fish Remix) – 5:44
 "One Life" (Mitchell Niemeyer Remix) – 3:38
 "One Life" (Bodybangers Remix Edit) – 3:42
 "One Life" (Instrumental) – 3:28

CD maxi single
 "One Life" (Radio Edit) – 3:31
 "One Life" (Bodybangers Remix) – 5:23
 "One Life" (Nino Fish Remix) – 5:45
 "One Life" (Bodybangers Remix Edit) – 3:42
 "One Life" (Instrumental) – 3:27

CD single
 "One Life" (Radio Edit) – 3:31
 "One Life" (Bodybangers Remix) – 5:23

Charts and certifications

Weekly charts

Yearly charts

Certifications

References

2013 singles
Madcon songs
Kelly Rowland songs
2013 songs
Epic Records singles
Songs written by Kelly Rowland